In the Limelight is a 2011 Philippine television entertainment news broadcasting show broadcast by GMA News TV. Anchored by Rhian Ramos, Nelson Canlas and Aubrey Carampel, it premiered on February 28, 2011. The show concluded on October 7, 2011. It was replaced by Showbiz Exclusives in its timeslot.

Premise
The show features different entertainment news and features on different entertainment industry issues.

Accolades

References

2011 Philippine television series debuts
2011 Philippine television series endings
Filipino-language television shows
GMA Integrated News and Public Affairs shows
GMA News TV original programming
Philippine television news shows
Entertainment news shows in the Philippines